Rev. Rufus B. Tobey (1849–1920) was a Congregationalist pastor who founded the Floating Hospital for Children in Boston, which was later renamed  Tufts Children's Hospital at Tufts Medical Center. 

Rufus Babcock Tobey was born in New Bedford, Massachusetts, on May 6, 1849, to Charles Tobey and Maria Robbins. Tobey attended Phillips Academy Andover and then Amherst College, graduating in the class of 1877. He then graduated from Andover Seminary in 1880.  Tobey first served as a pastor in Harwich, Massachusetts, before founding a Congregational church in Helena, Montana.  He then returned to Harwich before leaving to serve as a pastor at Berkeley Temple in Boston.  While at Berkeley he developed a friendship with Dr. Edward Everett Hale, and with his support, Tobey founded Floating Hospital for Children in Boston harbor.  Tobey also was a co-founder of Ingleside Home at Revere for young girls, and he was active with the Mount Pleasant Home for Aged Men and Women.    He served as a pastor of Berkeley Temple church in Boston.  He was married to Carolina Gifford until her death in 1890. He then married Genevieve Gifford of  Nebraska and left a daughter upon his death in 1920. Tobey died on January 6, 1920, in Middleborough, Massachusetts, and was buried at Mount Wollaston Cemetery in Quincy.

References

People from New Bedford, Massachusetts
People from Middleborough, Massachusetts
American Congregationalists
Tufts University
Amherst College alumni
Phillips Academy alumni